The 2022 Nevada state elections took place on November 8, 2022. On that date, the State of Nevada held elections for the following offices: Governor, Lieutenant Governor, Attorney General, Secretary of State, Treasurer, Controller, U.S. Senate, U.S. House of Representatives, Nevada Senate, Nevada Assembly, and various others. In addition, several measures were on the ballot.

United States Senate

Incumbent Democratic U.S. Senator Catherine Cortez Masto was re-elected to a second term by a very narrow margin over Republican challenger Adam Laxalt.

United States House of Representatives

All of Nevada's four seats in the United States House of Representatives are up for election in 2022.

Governor

Incumbent Democratic Governor Steve Sisolak ran for a second term. He was defeated by Clark County Sheriff Joe Lombardo.

Lieutenant Governor

Incumbent Democratic Lieutenant Governor Lisa Cano Burkhead sought a first full term. She was defeated by Las Vegas City Council member Stavros Anthony.

Attorney General

Incumbent Democratic Attorney General Aaron D. Ford ran for a second term. He defeated attorney Sigal Chattah.

Secretary of State

Incumbent Republican Barbara Cegavske was term-limited and could not seek a third term. Former staffer for Harry Reid, Cisco Aguilar defeated former Assemblyman Jim Marchant.

State Treasurer

Incumbent Democrat Zach Conine sought a second term. He defeated former Las Vegas City Councilwoman, Michele Fiore.

State Legislature

Elections were held to half of the seats in the Nevada Senate and all of the seats in the Nevada Assembly. The Democratic Party held a majority in both houses.

Ballot measures
Two ballot measures which would increase gaming and sales taxes and dedicate revenue to education were placed on the ballot after the Nevada Legislature chose to not act on them during the session. A Nevada Equal Rights Amendment which would prohibit discrimination based on an individual's race, color, creed, sex, sexual orientation, gender identity or expression, age, disability, ancestry or national origin was also placed on the ballot. The third ballot measure would replace both the primary and voting systems with top-five-based Ranked-choice voting system.

Equal Rights Amendment

Polling

Minimum Wage Amendment

Polling

Top-Five Ranked Choice Voting Initiative

Polling

Notes

References

 
Nevada